Alaudagasse is a station on Line U1 of the Vienna U-Bahn located in the 10th district of Vienna. It was opened on September 2, 2017. It is part of the extension of the U1 from Reumannplatz to Therme Wien in Oberlaa.

The station, like the majority of the extension, is on or below the north-south Favoritenstraße and is named after the branching here Alaudagasse on the northern edge of the Per-Albin-Hansson Siedlung Ost, which is located east of the route. West of the station is the Per-Albin-Hansson Siedlung Nord. With the opening of the extension of the U1, the tram line 67 was shut down; it had served the stops Alaudagasse and Stockholmer Platz within the area of the current station.

South of the Alaudagasse station, the U1 towards Oberlaa, which until this point ran along the Favoritenstraße, branches off and now runs parallel to the Donauländebahn to the Therme Wien. Here, a double-track turning system was built, which is designed in preparation for a line bifurcation. Thus, the possibility of an extension of the U1 to Rothneusiedl, as had been originally planned, remains.

References 

Favoriten
Vienna U-Bahn stations
Railway stations opened in 2017
2017 establishments in Austria
Pages with unreviewed translations
Railway stations in Austria opened in the 21st century